Karoline von Manderscheid-Blankenheim (Karoline Felicitas Engelberte; 13 November 1768, Vienna – 1 March 1831 in Vienna), was a princess consort of Liechtenstein; married on 16 November 1783 to prince Alois I of Liechtenstein.

Karoline was the daughter of Count Johann Wilhelm von Manderscheid-Blankenheim zu Geroldseck and Countess Johanna Maximiliana Franziska von Limburg-Stirum (daughter of Count Christian Otto of Limburg-Stirum). She had no children with her spouse, but two children with her long term lover Franz von Langendonck, captain of the Austrian army; one was her son Karl Ludwig (1793–dead after 1868), Viscount von Fribert. In 1805, her husband died and was succeeded by her brother-in-law as monarch. Karoline spent her remaining life mainly in Vienna.

Ancestry

References
 Centre d'Études des Dynasties Royales Européenes.

1768 births
1831 deaths
Austrian countesses
Princely consorts of Liechtenstein
18th-century Liechtenstein women
19th-century Liechtenstein women
18th-century Austrian women
19th-century Austrian women
Burials in Vienna